Chae-won is a Korean feminine given name. The meaning differs based on the hanja used to write each syllable of the name. There are 4 hanja with the reading "chae" and 11 hanja with the reading "won" among the Basic Hanja for educational use, and another 14 with the reading "chae" and 34 with the reading "won" in the Table of Hanja for Personal Name Use as of December 2018.  Chae-won was the seventh-most-popular name for newborn girls in South Korea in 2013.

People
People with this name include:

Kim Chae-won (writer) (born 1946), South Korean writer
Lee Chae-won (born 1981), South Korean female cross-country skier
Moon Chae-won (born 1986), South Korean actress
So Chae-won (born 1997), South Korean archer
Kim Chae-won (singer, born 2000), South Korean singer and member of girl group Le Sserafim

Fictional characters
Fictional characters with this name include:

Min Chae-won, in 2013 South Korean television series A Hundred Year Legacy

See also
List of Korean given names

References

Korean feminine given names